The Churches Conservation Trust, which was initially known as the Redundant Churches Fund, is a charity whose purpose is to protect historic churches at risk, those that have been made redundant by the Church of England. The Trust was established by the Pastoral Measure of 1968. The legally defined object of the Trust is "the preservation, in the interests of the nation and the Church of England, of churches and parts of churches of historic and archaeological interest or architectural quality vested in the Fund ... together with their contents so vested".  The charity cares for over 350 churches.  The Trust is financed partly by the Department for Culture, Media and Sport and the Church Commissioners, but grants from those bodies were frozen in 2001, since when additional funding has come from other sources, including the general public. In the 12 months ending 31 March 2010 the charity's income was £6,161,653, and its spending was £6,035,871.  During that year it had 44 employees, and used the services of 2,000 volunteers.  The charity is run by a board of trustees, who delegate the day-to-day management to a chief executive and his senior management team.

The Trust's primary aim is to ensure that the buildings in its care are weatherproof and to prevent any deterioration in their condition.  The majority of the churches remain consecrated, and many are occasionally still used for worship.  Local communities are encouraged to use them for appropriate activities and events, and the buildings provide an educational resource, allowing children and young people to study history and architecture. Nearly 2 million people visit the Trust's churches each year.

There are 104 churches preserved by the Churches Conservation Trust in the East of England, comprising those in the counties of Bedfordshire, Cambridgeshire, Essex, Hertfordshire, Lincolnshire, Norfolk, and Suffolk.  The churches range in age from St Nicholas' Church, Feltwell, which contains fabric from the Saxon era, to the newest church, St Michael the Archangel's Church, Booton, which was built in the later part of the 19th century.  All but twelve of the churches were built before the end of the 15th century, so the main architectural styles represented are Norman and English Gothic.  There is one church in Georgian style (Old All Saints Church, Great Steeping) and one in Palladian style (St Andrew's Church, Gunton). The newest six churches are Gothic Revival in style.  All the churches have been designated by English Heritage as listed buildings, almost all of them at Grades I and II*.

Some of the churches stand in or near the centres of cities or towns, and their functions have been taken over by nearby churches: examples include St Martin's Church, Colchester, St John the Baptist's Church, Stamford, St Peter's Church, Sudbury, St Mary at the Quay Church, Ipswich, three churches in Norwich, and two in Cambridge. The Church of St Cyriac and St Julitta, Swaffham Prior is so close to the Church of St Mary that the churches share the same churchyard; the functions of both are now undertaken by St Mary's.  Other churches stand in remote or isolated positions in the countryside.  Some fell into disuse because the village they served was deserted, or the local population moved elsewhere, such as St Peter's Church, Kingerby, St Andrew's Church, Sapiston, St Denys' Church, Little Barford, and St Mary's Church, Chilton.  In other cases the church originally served the estate of a country house but no longer does: examples include St Lawrence's Church, Snarford, Oxhey Chapel, and St Andrew's Church, Gunton.  In some cases, only part of the church has been conserved, as with St Mary, West Walton, where the detached tower is conserved but its church continues in use.  All Saints Church, Newton Green has been divided at the chancel, which continues to be used for worship although the rest of the church is maintained by the Trust.  Only the Audley chapel of St Michael's Church, Berechurch has been conserved; the rest of it was converted for other uses.  Most of the churches remain consecrated and hold occasional services if practical, and some are used for other purposes such as concert venues.

Key

Churches

See also
List of churches preserved by the Churches Conservation Trust in the English Midlands
List of churches preserved by the Churches Conservation Trust in Northern England
List of churches preserved by the Churches Conservation Trust in Southeast England
List of churches preserved by the Churches Conservation Trust in Southwest England

Notes

The dates given for construction are often not exactly known. Where this is the case the century of first construction of the existing building is given.

References

Bibliography

Churches Conservation Trust in the East of England

Churches Conservation Trust in the East of England